Peter Badovinac (born October 6, 1989) is an American football coach who is currently an offensive assistant at Baylor University.

Early life
Badovinac played high school football at Loyola Academy where he was coached by former NFL linebacker, John Holecek. In 2007 he was selected Chicago Catholic League Offensive Player of the Year. He started his collegiate career in 2008 at Drake, where he redshirted and then played one season prior to transferring to Michigan State. He then played for the Spartans from 2010 to 2012. During his time at MSU, the Spartans won the 2010 Big Ten Championship, played in the inaugural Big Ten Championship Game in 2011, and won two bowl games.

Coaching career

Missouri
Following his playing career, Badovinac worked for two years at Missouri, where he helped the Tigers to a 22-5 record and back-to-back SEC East titles. Badovinac began his career in coaching as a recruiting graduate assistant at Missouri prior to serving as a defensive graduate assistant for the 2013 and 2014 seasons.

Missouri State
Badovinac worked for three years (2015–17) as the linebackers coach and recruiting coordinator at Missouri State. During his time with the Bears, Badovinac mentored 2016 consensus All-American and current Houston Texans Dylan Cole, who was a finalist for the Buck Buchanan Award after leading the nation in tackles per game.

Ohio State
On March 9, 2018, Badovinac was hired as a defensive graduate assistant at Ohio State. The Buckeyes won the Big Ten Conference and the Rose Bowl.

Oklahoma
In January 2019, Badovinac was hired as a defensive graduate assistant at Oklahoma, a position he held briefly before leaving to join the Arizona Cardinals.

Arizona Cardinals
On February 6, 2019, Badovinac was hired by the Arizona Cardinals to be their assistant wide receivers coach.

Baylor University
Badovinac is currently an offensive assistant at Baylor University.

References

External links
 Arizona Cardinals bio

1989 births
Living people
American football quarterbacks
Arizona Cardinals coaches
Missouri Tigers football coaches
Missouri State Bears football coaches
Ohio State Buckeyes football coaches
Oklahoma Sooners football coaches
Players of American football from Illinois
Baylor Bears football coaches
People from Hoffman Estates, Illinois
Sportspeople from the Chicago metropolitan area
Coaches of American football from Illinois
Drake Bulldogs football players
Michigan State Spartans football players